Hänsch-Arena is a stadium in Meppen, Emsland, Lower Saxony, Germany. It is used as the home stadium of SV Meppen and has a capacity of 13,696 seats.

References

External links
 Hänsch-Arena on svmeppen.de
 Stadium history on svmeppen.de
 Hänsch-Arena on stadionwelt.de

Football venues in Germany
Sports venues in Lower Saxony
SV Meppen